Urquinaona is a station in the Barcelona Metro network, served by TMB lines L1 and L4. One of the metro stations in the city centre, and one of the busiest, it's located underneath Ronda de Sant Pere and Via Laietana, next to Plaça Urquinaona - after which it is named - in the Eixample. It can be accessed from Plaça Urquinaona and Via Laietana.

The part of the station serving line L4 was opened in 1926 as part of what was then line 3, as a part of the stretch between Passeig de Gràcia and Jaume I. The stretch was later extended to Barceloneta, and in 1973 was made a part of L4. The line L1 platforms were opened in 1932, as a part of the section between Catalunya and Arc de Triomf section.

The L1 platforms are oriented from west to east and is located under Ronda de Sant Pere. They have three vestibules, two at the eastern side (Plaça Urquinaona) and one at the western side. The transfer to L4 is made through the eastern vestibule, which also serves as the northern vestibule of the L4 platforms. The tracks served by these platforms are separated from each other by the through tracks of the ADIF line linking Plaça de Catalunya and Arc de Triomf stations, although these are hidden from the platforms by intermediate walls.

The L4 platforms are oriented from north to south is located in the meridional direction (north-south). They have vestibules at both ends, the northern one leading to Plaça Urquinaona and the southern one to Via Laietana.

See also
List of Barcelona Metro stations

References

External links

Barcelona Metro line 1 stations
Barcelona Metro line 4 stations
Transport in Eixample
Railway stations in Spain opened in 1926
Railway stations located underground in Spain